Gommerville is a commune in the Eure-et-Loir department in northern France. On 1 January 2016, the former commune of Orlu was merged into Gommerville.

Population

See also
Communes of the Eure-et-Loir department

References

Communes of Eure-et-Loir